Jeremy West (born 29 April 1961) is a British sprint canoeist who competed in the mid to late 1980s. He won two gold medals at the 1986 ICF Canoe Sprint World Championships in Montreal, earning them in the K-1 500 m and K-1 1000 m events.

West also competed in two Summer Olympics, earning his best finish of fifth in the K-4 1000 m event at Los Angeles in 1984.

References

1961 births
Canoeists at the 1984 Summer Olympics
Canoeists at the 1988 Summer Olympics
Living people
Olympic canoeists of Great Britain
ICF Canoe Sprint World Championships medalists in kayak
British male canoeists